The 2021 Russian Mixed Doubles Curling Cup was held from August 27 to 30, 2021 at the "Baikal" Ice Palace in Irkutsk.

The championship featured twenty teams split into four pools of five. After the round robin, the top two teams from each pool qualified for the playoffs. In the final, the pair of Nkeirouka Ezekh and Alexey Stukalskiy defeated pair of Anastasia Babarykina and Konstantin Manasevich 9–2 to claim the title.

Teams
The teams competing in the 2021 cup are:

Round-robin results and standings

Group A

Group B

Group C

Group D

Points: 2 for win, 1 for loss, 0 for technical loss (did not start)

Playoffs

«PP» — Power play

Quarterfinals 
Sunday, August 29, 17:30

Semifinals 
Monday, August 30, 10:00

Third place match 
Monday, August 30, 14:00

Final 
Monday, August 30, 14:00

Final standings

External links
 Video: YouTube channel "Russian Curling TV"
 Playlist «Кубок России по кёрлингу среди смешанных пар 2021» (2021 Russian Mixed Doubles Curling Cup) on YouTube (9 video)

References

Russian Mixed Doubles Curling Cup
Sport in Irkutsk
2021 in curling

Curling